Kyrylo Marsak (born 7 September 2004) is a Ukrainian figure skater. He is the 2022 Tallinn Trophy and 2022 Volvo Open Cup bronze medalist. In the 2021–22 season, he was the Ukrainian national junior champion and senior bronze medalist.

Personal life 
Marsak was born in Kherson, Ukraine. He grew up in Kyiv. His sister is six years older.

Career

Early years 
Marsak began learning to skate in 2009. In the 2018–19 season, he made his first appearance at the senior-level Ukrainian Championships.

2021–22 season 
For most of the season, Marsak trained in Kyiv, coached by Dmytro Shkidchenko. On 24 February 2022, Russia launched a massive invasion of Ukraine. At the time, Marsak was 17 and living with his family in Kyiv. He initially remained in Ukraine but "not one day went by where there were no explosions". After three weeks, he fled with his sister to Poland.

In April, Marsak placed 33rd at the 2022 World Junior Championships in Tallinn, Estonia.

2022–23 season 
After spending some time in Latvia, Marsak went to Finland in June 2022 for a training camp led by Alina Mayer-Virtanen. In response to an appeal from the Ukrainian Figure Skating Federation, she and her husband, Valtter Virtanen, decided to help Marsak prepare for the season. In August, he began training at the couple's skating club, the Peurunka Skating Academy in Laukaa. Shkidchenko remained in Ukraine but continued to guide Marsak via Viber.

In September, Marsak placed ninth at the ISU Junior Grand Prix event in Latvia. He made his senior international debut in October, at the 2022 CS Finlandia Trophy. His first senior international medals, both bronze, came the following month, at the Volvo Open Cup in Latvia and Tallinn Trophy in Estonia.

In January, Ukraine named Marsak to replace the injured Ivan Shmuratko at the 2023 European Championships in Espoo, Finland. He qualified to the final segment in 17th place after the short. Shkidchenko died the day before the free skate. Marsak placed 22nd in the free and finished 21st overall.

Programs

Competitive highlights 
CS: Challenger Series; JGP: Junior Grand Prix

Detailed results 
Small medals for short and free programs are awarded only at ISU Championships. Personal bests are highlighted in bold.

Senior level

References

External links 
 
 

2004 births
Ukrainian male single skaters
Living people
Sportspeople from Kherson